Richard Lawson (16 June 1875–29 October 1971) was a New Zealand teacher, university professor and educationalist. He was born in Warrnambool, Victoria, Australia on 16 June 1875.

References

1875 births
1971 deaths
New Zealand educators
New Zealand academics
Australian emigrants to New Zealand
People from Warrnambool